Yanagi was one of four s built for the Imperial Japanese Navy during World War I. She was converted to a training hulk in 1940 and was scrapped in 1947.

Design and description
The Momo-class destroyers were enlarged and faster versions of the preceding  with a more powerful armament. The Momos were powered by two Brown-Curtis geared steam turbines, each driving one shaft using steam produced by four Kampon water-tube boilers. Two boilers burned a mixture of coal and fuel oil while the other pair only used oil. Their crew consisted of 110 officers and ratings.

The main armament of the Momo-class ships consisted of three quick-firing (QF)  guns; one gun each was located at the bow and stern with the third gun positioned between the funnels. Their torpedo armament consisted of two triple rotating mounts for  torpedoes located fore and aft of the funnels.

Construction and career
[[File:Gunkannbouhatei yanagi.jpg|thumb|left|Yanagi'''s remaining hull in use as a breakwater, seen in 2012.]]Yanagi was launched on 24 February 1917 at the Sasebo Naval Arsenal and completed on 5 May. The ship played a minor role in World War I and participated in the 1937 Battle of Shanghai that began the Second Sino-Japanese War. She was decommissioned on 1 April 1940, converted into a stationary training ship and broken up in 1947. The ship's hulk alongside the former destroyer Suzutsuki and Fuyuzuki were used as breakwaters in Kitakyushu. Currently, only Yanagi'''s hulk is visible above ground while the other two has been cemented underground in place.

References

Bibliography

 

1917 ships
Ships built by Sasebo Naval Arsenal
Momo-class destroyers